Veolia Environmental Services (in French Veolia Propreté), formerly Onyx Environnement, is a division of Veolia Environnement. It employs nearly 78,000 staff, has operations in 35 countries around the world, and generated revenues of nearly €9.02 billion in 2009.

It specialises in the management, treatment and disposal of waste, as well as the recycling, reclamation and re-use of waste products. Veolia Environmental Services manage solid and liquid waste, as well as hazardous and non-hazardous waste materials.

History

1853: The French Compagnie Générale des Eaux (CGE) began as a water industry company.

1953: CGE begins to collect household waste.

1975: The firm SARP Industry is founded to treat hazardous waste.

1980: CGE takes full control of the Compagnie Générale de Chauffe (CGC), a company with which it has already operated incineration plants since 1967. CGE also assumes control of the Compagnie Générale d'Entreprises Automobiles (CGEA), a business with significant presence in household waste management and in urban transportation.

1986: CGE opens its first waste drop-off centres.

1989: Creation of the Onyx Environnement brand, which unifies all of CGEA's waste management activities.

1998: Parent company CGE was renamed Vivendi.

1999: Creation of Vivendi Environnement to consolidate environmental activities of Vivendi. Vivendi Environnement divested by Vivendi between 2000 and 2002.

2003: Vivendi Environnement becomes Veolia Environnement.

2005: Onyx becomes Veolia Environmental Services.

In 2009, the company collected 42.7 million tonnes of waste, treated 62.5 million tonnes, and recycled 12.7 million tonnes.

In 2015, Veolia North America was paid $40,000 to produce a report on Flint, Michigan's water supply. Veolia Vice President Rob Nicholas asserted that the water was safe to drink and met state and federal standards. The report received additional scrutiny in 2016 after a state of emergency was declared over toxic levels of chemicals detected in Flint's water supply. A Veolia spokesperson asserted that testing for lead and copper levels was beyond the scope of their work.

Boycotts 
Veolia has been the target of boycotts and divestment campaigns, primarily by pro-Palestinian groups. In 2013, a "Dump Veolia" campaign organized by the St. Louis Palestine Solidarity Committee succeeded in halting approval of a multi-million dollar contract with Veolia. The pro-Palestinian group opposed contracting with Veolia on three primary human rights grounds. They allege that:
Veolia Environmental Services-Israel, a subsidiary, manages the Tovla landfill in the Jordan Valley.
The subsidiary Connex-Israel "confiscated land with portions closed entirely to Palestinians".
Veolia Transport's development of the Jerusalem Light Rail system.

In 2012, Veolia withdrew from a £4.7 Billion contract in north London, under pressure from a 2-year campaign by the No to Veolia Action Group (No2VAG). In addition to the objections of the "Dump Veolia" campaign, No2VAG also highlighted what it described as racist literature in Veolia's advertisements for drivers, which required completion of military service and a "mother tongue" of Hebrew.

Several university organizations have supported anti-Veolia protests and boycotts, including at Oberlin College and at the University of Sheffield. In 2013, the Sheffield Palestinian Solidarity Group succeeded in petitioning the university to end their waste management contract with Veolia.

Activities
Veolia Environmental Services collects, recycles and treats waste. Its activities cover liquid waste, solid waste, hazardous or non-hazardous waste, and refuse collected from household and industrial sources.

Company services
For private companies, it delivers the following services:
 Management and exploitation of waste, including collection and advanced treatment of hazardous waste
 Operation and maintenance of chemical, petrochemical, metallurgical and automotive plants and equipment, including high-pressure cleaning services and cryogenics

In 2009, Veolia Environmental Services had 819,000 business customers in the world.

Public authority services
For local authorities and boroughs (for example in Paris, London, Alexandria, Singapore and Dresden), Veolia Environmental Services collects and sorts waste, transports it to treatment subsidiaries and plants, and operates landfill sites.

Some contracts secured by Veolia Environmental Services in 2010:
 A 6-year contract to recover energy from compost and recyclable materials from household waste in the Angers region of France. The contract was awarded by the Angers Loire metropolitan area, and is worth over €45 million.
 The Hong Kong Government contracted Veolia Environnement to design, build and operate a sludge treatment plant. Veolia Environmental Services will operate the facility jointly with Veolia Water. The contract is worth €20 million per year, and the site will eventually produce 20 MW of electricity through energy recovery techniques.
 VES have a long lasting contract in Sheffield, South Yorkshire, UK in partnership with the local authority council. Run from the side of its unique Energy Recovery Facility its head of collections is run by Shane Atkins with his team of contract supervisors including Wayne Fennel, Anita Fieldsend, Louisa Schofield, Andrew Buckley and Lewis Robinson.

Sorting and recycling
Veolia Environmental Services operates 352 centres for sorting and recycling. It treats and recycles waste to produce raw materials for industry. This includes collecting paper, cardboard, glass, plastics, wood, metal and waste electrical and electronic items.

Treatment and recovery of waste
A number of Veolia Environmental Services are based on specific treatment and waste recovery techniques and technologies.

 Treatment of hazardous waste: incineration of organic liquid waste, recycling of solvents etc.
 Storage and energy exploitation of non-hazardous waste. In 2008, Veolia Environmental Services launched a pilot facility for the production of biofuels from biogas emitted by non-hazardous waste stored at Claye-Souilly near Paris, France. The pilot has been fully operational since September 2009, and produces enough biomethane to power Veolia Environnement's fleet of vehicles serving the Claye-Souilly site, resulting in a net savings of 882 metric tons of CO2 per year.
 Treatment of urban and industrial sewage and its re-use in agriculture.
 Incineration and energy exploitation of non-hazardous solids for urban heating networks.

In 2009, Veolia sold:
 €5.1 million MWh of electricity, equivalent to the electricity consumption of 900,000 Europeans,
 3.2 million MWh of thermal energy.

Hazardous waste treatment
Veolia Environmental Services is a specialist in the treatment of hazardous waste materials. These include toxic liquid wastes, battery acids and fluids, solvents and metals. It has 71 physical-chemical hazardous waste treatment facilities.
In a demonstration of its business offer in this area, Veolia Environmental Services was contracted by the Ukrainian Environment Ministry to safely dispose of 1,000 tonnes of pesticide.

Veolia Environmental Services worldwide
Veolia Environmental Services is located in 32 countries around the world:

 Europe (77% of revenues): France, UK, Ireland, Switzerland, Belgium, Germany, Italy, Spain, Denmark, Czech Republic, Poland, Slovakia, Hungary, Ukraine, Lithuania, Estonia, Latvia.
 North America (14% of revenues) and South America : United States, Canada, Brazil, Mexico
 Africa, Middle East, South America (2% of revenues): Morocco, Tunisia, Egypt, Israel, Qatar, UAE, Mexico,
 Asia-Pacific (7% of revenues): China, Taiwan, Singapore, South Korea, Australia.

References

External links
 Official Veolia Environmental Services website 
 Veolia website — parent corporation.
 Veolia — sustainable development website
 Veolia Environnement Foundation website

Veolia
Waste management companies of France
Multinational companies headquartered in France
French companies established in 2005